Act 1696, or the Flag Act, (Philippine Commission Act № 1696, August 23, 1907) is an act of the Philippine Commission that outlawed the display of Katipunan flags, banners, emblems, or devices in the American-controlled Philippine Islands. Both the current national anthem, Lupang Hinirang, and the present-day Flag of the Philippines, would have been covered by this ban.

The Flag Act was repealed by the Philippine Legislature in 1919.

References

History of the Philippines (1898–1946)
1907 in law